Wayne Holden (May 29, 1918 – February 27, 2009) was an American politician. He served as a Democratic member of the Oklahoma House of Representatives. He also served as a member for the 24th district of the Oklahoma Senate.

Life and career 
Holden was born in Loco, Oklahoma, the son of Maudie Wilson and Ramon Holden. He attended Maud High School.

Holden was the mayor of Duncan, Oklahoma. and represented the Oklahoma Municipal League. In 1963, Holden was elected to the Oklahoma House of Representatives. He left that office in 1965 and was elected for the 24th district of the Oklahoma Senate, succeeding Leroy McClendon, serving until 1978, when he was succeeded by Kenneth Landis.

Holden died in February 2009 at his home, at the age of 90.

References 

1918 births
2009 deaths
Democratic Party members of the Oklahoma House of Representatives
Democratic Party Oklahoma state senators
20th-century American politicians
20th-century Members of the Oklahoma House of Representatives
Mayors of places in Oklahoma